The 2014 Daventry District Council election took place on 22 May 2014 to elect members of Daventry District Council in England. This was on the same day as other local elections.

Two seats changed hands with UKIP taking one seat from Labour and one seat from the Conservatives leading to the council being made up as follows; 30 Conservative councillors, 3 Labour councillors, 2 UKIP councillors and 1 Liberal Democrat councillor.

Election result

Ward results

Abbey North

Abbey South

Brixworth

Drayton

Hill

Long Buckby

Moulton

Spratton

Weedon

Welford

Woodford

Yelvertoft

References

2014 English local elections
2014
2010s in Northamptonshire